A recreation room (also known as a rec room, rumpus room, play room, playroom, games room, or ruckus room) is a room used for a variety of purposes, such as parties, games and other everyday or casual activities. The term recreation room is common in the United States, while the term rumpus room is common in Australia, New Zealand and Canada; in the United Kingdom, the preferred term is games room. Often children and teenagers entertain their friends in their home's rec room, which is often located in the basement, away from the main living areas of the house. Usually it is a larger space than a living room, enabling the area to serve multiple purposes and entertain moderately large groups.

Contents 
Recreation rooms can have many themes and contents, depending on their intended use.

Entertainment 
Recreation rooms are normally centered on some form of entertainment, typically an audio/video setup.  This can consist of something as elaborate as a projection screen with surround sound or something as simple as a base model television.

Seating 
Couches, pub tables/chairs, bar stools, and recliners may all be used in recreation rooms.

Games 
Tabletop games are frequent in recreation rooms.  In addition to games played on a normal table, recreation rooms sometimes include custom game tables for table tennis (ping pong), table football (foosball), table shuffleboard, air hockey, or billiards (pool).  Custom tables for casino games such as poker, blackjack, and craps are also common. Other games include dart boards and arcade games such as pinball and video games. More substantial game rooms may have mini bowling lanes, indoor golf simulators, and other specialty amenities.

Food and drink 
Fridges, microwave ovens, wet bars, popcorn makers, ice cream makers, soda fountains, classic soda coolers and televisions can sometimes be found in recreation rooms.

See also 
 Den (room)
 Home cinema
 Great room
 Living room
 Man cave

References

External links 
 

Rooms
Recreation